❌

Love and Redemption is a 2020 Chinese television series based on the novel Liu Li Mei Ren Sha by Shi Si Lang. It premiered on Youku and Mango TV on August 6, 2020. It stars actors Cheng Yi as Yu Sifeng and Yuan Bingyan as Chu Xuanji.

Plot 

A 1000 years ago, a bitter battle ensues between the Celestials and the Asuras in a struggle for power. The General of the Asura Clan, The Star of Mosha, is defeated by the God of War. He disappears and his soul is sealed in a crystal lamp, which is then sent to the mortal realm to be hidden. However, the God of War too, mysteriously vanishes along with him. A 1000 years later, both of their souls are sent to the mortal realm to undergo tribulation and the demonic realm begins to prepare the revive the Star of Mosha.

In the mortal realm, Chu Xuanji (Yuan Bingyan) is born to the Shaoyang Sect Leader without the power of perception through all 6 senses. She meets Yu Sifeng (Cheng Yi), a skilled disciple of the mysterious Lize Palace, during the Flower Banquet being held at Shaoyang. 
Sifeng falls for her, despite being forbidden to do so. 
A turn of events leads to Xuanji being injured during the banquet and she leaves to cultivate and train herself for four years. Sifeng returns to Lize Palace, where he is punished for breaking the sect rules with the Lover's Curse.

They encounter each other, years later and set off for their own adventures, but their journey is riddled with mysterious encounters and they start to realize that there is more to their past than they thought as a millennium-old conspiracy slowly comes to light.

Cast

Main Cast 

 Yuan Bingyan as Chu Xuanji (褚璇玑) / God of War 
 The youngest daughter of the Shaoyang Sect leader, Chu Lei who is actually the reincarnation of the God of War. Born as Xuanji, she has none of her six senses which makes her a weak cultivator compared to her sister, Linglong as well as the other disciples of Shaoyang Sect.
 Cheng Yi as Yu Sifeng (禹司凤)
 The young head disciple of Li Ze Palace. Sifeng is rational, calm, resourceful and is extremely skilled and powerful. Meeting Xuanji, Mingyan and Linglong introduces him to the concept of love, friendship and identity which he is deprived of as a disciple of Li Ze Palace. Also the only son of the Jade Emperor and the Demon Princess.

Supporting Cast

The Shaoyang Sect 

 Zhang Yuxi as Chu Linglong (褚玲珑)
 The eldest daughter of the Shaoyang Sect leader, Chu Lei and Chu Xuanji's twin sister. She has a bright personality but can be hot-tempted and is extremely protective of Xuanji. She is good friends with Minyan whom she also has romantic feelings for. Later, she is kidnapped by Wu Tong who extracts her primordial spirit and creates a new version of her from a flower demon. As Linglong's spirit is out of her body, her body is unconscious.
 Liu Xueyi as Hao Chen (昊辰)/ White Emperor Bai Di (白帝)
 A powerful senior disciple of the Shaoyang Sect. His actual identity is the Heavenly White Emperor (Bai Di) of the East.
 Li Junyi as Zhong Minyan (钟敏言)
 The sixth senior disciple of Shaoyang Sect and is good friends with Xuanji and Linglong. He has mutual feelings for Linglong. He also the first person to witness Xuanji's true power when she unconsciously defeats Gu Diao (the Eagle Demon). 
 Huang Peng as Du Mingxing, eldest disciple.
 Wang Xu Dong as Chen Minjue, second disciple.
 Zhou Yi Dan as Duan Qing
 A disciple who admires Hao Chen
 Gu Zhi Shen as Feng Minsheng, fourth disciple.
 Ma Li as Ouyang Minlin, fifth disciple.
 Zhou Yutong as A disciple who likes telling stories.
 He Zhonghua as Chu Lei
 The leader of Shaoyang Sect, Linglong and Xuanji's father. Although he is strict and stern in the rules of his sect and the cultivation of immortality, he cares a lot for his daughters.
 Min Chun Xiao as Chu Yinghong
 An elder of the Sect and Chu Lei's junior sister. She is a kind-hearted aunt to Linglong and Xuanji. 
 Zhang Lei as Heng Yang
 An elder who is responsible for protecting the Shaoyang Sect's secret mirror.
 Yang Zi Jiang as He Yang, a Sect elder.
 Zhu Rong Rong as Lv Yang
 An elder of the Sect who is in charge of detecting anomalies. 
 Cheng Rang as Pu Yang, a Sect elder.
 Zhang Yan Yan as He Danping
 Xuanji and Linglong's deceased mother. She was murdered after discovering a secret about the Li Ze Palace.

The Li Ze Palace 

 Mickey He as Master of Li Ze Palace
 He dotes on Sifeng and his abilities. He is later revealed to be his father. 
 Zhu Zi Xiao as Yuan Lang (元朗)
 Deputy Master of Li Ze Palace. He appears ambitious, cunning and duplicitous.
 Zhou Jun Wei as Ruo Yu (若玉)'' 
 Sifeng's disciple brother and is secretly Yuan Lang's subordinate. 
 Han Cheng Yu as Liu Yihuan
 An abandoned disciple who violated Sect rules by having romantic feelings and having a child. 
 Xu Hai Wei as Elder Bai
 Hu Yuan Song as Elder Luo
 Sun Xue Jun as Elder He

Heavenly Celestial Realm 

 Huang Hai Bing as the Heavenly Emperor
 He currently resides at Mount Kunlun, adhering to being a bystander of all events.
 Wei Wei as Star Lord Si Ming
 A deity who serves the White Emperor Bai Di in the Heavenly realm.
 Bai Shu as Teng She (騰蛇)
 An arrogant celestial lord who loves eating and getting into fights. He later becomes Xuanji's spirit pet after causing havoc in a small village in his Flying Snake form. Although appearing to dislike Xuanji, he deeply cares for her and aids her through her troubles.
 Lu Peng as Qing Long (青龙)
 One of the four heavenly beasts, the Azura Dragon. He is also Teng She's friend.
 Huang Qian as Bai Hu (白虎)
 One of the four heavenly beasts, the White Tiger.
 Mao Yi Wen as Xuan Wu (玄武)
 One of the four heavenly beasts, the Black Tortoise.
 Dai Zi Xiang as Zhu Que (朱雀)
 One of the four Heavenly beasts, the Vermilion Bird.

Mount Kunlun 
Tian Yu Peng as Lord Xuan Huo
A celestial official who is responsible for protecting the Heavenly Emperor's stay at Mount Kunlun.
Liu Li as Wu Lu
One of the ten sorcerers that protects the borders of Mount Kunlun.
Mao Na as Wu Peng
One of the ten sorcerers that helps keeps the borders of Mount Kunlun safe. She is espically skilled in creating illusions.
Yan Feng as Wu Fan
Another sorcerer that helps keeps the borders safe.

Demon Tribe 

 Li Xin Ze as Lou Hou Ji Du [Rahu Ketu] / Star of Mosha (羅喉計都)
 The Demon Maleficent Star and a powerful general under the command of King Asura. He was actually King Bailing/Hao Chen's best friend later turned enemies with him because of betrayal. He wanted to stop the war but before that he was poisoned by Hao Chen/King Bailing.
 Ma Jing Han as King Xiu Luo [Asura] (修羅王)
 The Demon King who raged a war with the Heavenly Realm 1,000 of years ago with the help of the Star of Mosha. 
 Zhu Zi Xiao as Yuan Lang (元朗)
 Right Minister of the Demon Tribe and the Master of Tian Xu Hall. He is obsessed with possessing the four spiritual keys. 
 Fu Fang Jun as Wu Zhiqi (無支祁)
 Left Minister of the Demon Tribe who aids The Star of Mosha. He is a monkey demon in his true form. 
 Huang You Ming as Wu Tong
 A former disciple of Dian Jing Valley who became banished from his sect after his attempt to cause harm. Due to his banishment and exile, he resorts to joining the Demon Tribe and becomes Yuan Lang's subordinate. Wu Tong is an arrogant and vicious man. He falls in love at first sight with Ling long and attempts to manipulate her memories.

Tian Xu/Sky Hall 

 Li Ze as Di Lang
 A member of Tian Xu Hall who is also a loyal subordinate of Yuan Lang. He assists his master's desire to obtain three of the spirit keys and ultimately sacrifices himself for Yuan Lang. He takes on the identity of Ouyang and works as an attendant at Fu Yu Island.
 Wang Jiu Sheng as Elder Xing Su
 An astronomer and advisor.

Immortal Spirits and Demons 
Hong Mengyao as Zi Hu (紫狐)
A purple fox spirit from the Qingqiu Fox Tribe that loves grapes. She resides and trains at Zhongli City and impersonates the identity of Goddess Gao. She is deeply devoted to Wu Zhiqi, going to lengths as cultivating a human form and waited a thousand years for him.
Yao Yi Chen as Ting Nu (亭奴)
A merman who was formerly a fairy doctor in the Heavenly Realm before his banishment and subsequent reincarnication to the Merfolk Tribe. He is skilled in medicine and healing. Aware of his past life as a celestial being, he recognises Xuanji's true identity. He develops a friendship with Sifeng and Xuanji and helps them along their journey.
Liu Meng Rui as Yu Er
 Liu Yihuan's daughter who is a half demon.
Xu Yuan Yuan as a Flower Demon
An unnamed flower demon who Wu Tong rescues and helps. In return, she transforms herself into Linglong, combining half of hers and Linglong's primordial spirits into one form. She later betrays him as she regains awareness of her true identity and is killed by Wu Tong.
Yang Xi Zi as Lu Yanran/Xiao Yinghua
 The human form of a silver flower snake. She is Sifeng's spirit animal who secretly admires him. She takes on the identity of a Dian Jing Valley disciple.
Bai Yimeng as a little demon spirit

Xuan Yuan Sect 

 Du Jun Ze as Zhu Shi
 Sect Leader. He and his sect are brutally killed by the Tian Xu Sect after refusing to give up one of the four spirital keys. 
 Wang Bin as Elder Ling Shi
 Wang Xiao Wei as Elder Xuan Shi
 Yan Yi Long as Elder Mo Shi
 Jiang Zhen Hao as disciple Shi Feng

Fu Yu Island 

 Qian Yong Chen as Dongfang Qingqi
 The Chief of Fu Yu Island. He is deeply, although unrequitedly in love with his wife, Qing Rong. He is so blind in his love for her that he ignores the fact that she loves someone else. 
 Zhao Yingzi as Qing Rong
 Madame Dongfang, the wife of the Sect Chief who is also considered the most beautiful woman in the world. She is actually the last remaining member of the Saintess Cult Demon Tribe that was annihilated by the people of Fu Yu Island. She loves and has an affair with Ouyang without knowing his true motives.
 Fu Meng Ni as Yu Ning
 A disciple of the Island Sect and befriends Xuanji and Sifeng.
 Wu Yi Tao as Pian Pian
 A disciple of the Island Sect and also befriends Xuanji and Sifeng. 
 Wang Xing Yi as Elder Kong Ding
 Li Ze as Attendant Ouyang, Di Lang in disguise.

Dian Jing Valley 

 Yu Bin as Lord Rong
 Sect Leader.
 Han Ye as Wen Haofeng
 A disciple and a daughter of the former Dian Jing Valley Sect Leader. She is Sifeng's mother.

Other Supporting Cast 

Huang Yi as Ah Lan
Sifeng's companion who follows him to practice medical skills and spells. She admires him. 
Wu Yu Jue as Ruo Xue
Ruo Yu's younger sister.
Song Kai as Yu Lu
A guard at Fenru City.
Yu Qing as Shen Shu
A guard at Fenru City
Zhang Gong as Emperor
An Emperor in the mortal realm in one of Xuanji's past lives.
Chu Fei as Elder Bi

References 

2020 Chinese television series debuts